This is a list of disorders included in newborn screening programs around the world, along with information on testing methodologies, disease incidence and rationale for being included in screening programs.

American College of Medical Genetics recommendations

Core panel
The following conditions and disorders were recommended as a "core panel" by the 2005 report of the American College of Medical Genetics (ACMG). The incidences reported below are from the full report, though the rates may vary in different populations. 
				
Blood cell disorders				
 Sickle cell anemia (Hb SS) > 1 in 5,000; among African-Americans 1 in 400				
 Sickle-cell disease (Hb S/C) > 1 in 25,000 				
 Hb S/Beta-Thalassemia (Hb S/Th) > 1 in 50,000 				
				
Inborn errors of amino acid metabolism				
 Tyrosinemia I (TYR I)  < 1 in 100,000				
 Argininosuccinic aciduria (ASA) < 1 in 100,000				
 Citrullinemia (CIT) < 1 in 100,000				
 Phenylketonuria (PKU) > 1 in 25,000				
 Maple syrup urine disease (MSUD)  < 1 in 100,000				
 Homocystinuria (HCY) < 1 in 100,000 				
				
Inborn errors of organic acid metabolism		
 Glutaric acidemia type I (GA I) > 1 in 75,000		
 Hydroxymethylglutaryl lyase deficiency (HMG) < 1 in 100,000 		
 Isovaleric acidemia (IVA) < 1 in 100,000 		
 3-Methylcrotonyl-CoA carboxylase deficiency (3MCC) > 1 in 75,000 		
 Methylmalonyl-CoA mutase deficiency (MUT) > 1 in 75,000 		
 Methylmalonic aciduria, cblA and cblB forms (MMA, Cbl A,B) < 1 in 100,000 		
 Beta-ketothiolase deficiency (BKT) < 1 in 100,000 		
 Propionic acidemia (PROP) > 1 in 75,000 		
 Multiple-CoA carboxylase deficiency (MCD) < 1 in 100,000 		
		
Inborn errors of fatty acid metabolism		
 Long-chain hydroxyacyl-CoA dehydrogenase deficiency (LCHAD) > 1 in 75,000 		
 Medium-chain acyl-CoA dehydrogenase deficiency (MCAD) > 1 in 25,000 		
 Very-long-chain acyl-CoA dehydrogenase deficiency (VLCAD) > 1 in 75,000 		
 Trifunctional protein deficiency (TFP) < 1 in 100,000 		
 Carnitine uptake defect (CUD) < 1 in 100,000

Miscellaneous multisystem diseases
 Cystic fibrosis (CF) > 1 in 5,000
 Congenital hypothyroidism (CH) > 1 in 5,000
 Biotinidase deficiency (BIOT) > 1 in 75,000
 Congenital adrenal hyperplasia (CAH) > 1 in 25,000
 Classical galactosemia (GALT)  > 1 in 50,000

Newborn screening by other methods than blood testing
 Congenital deafness (HEAR) > 1 in 5,000

Secondary targets 
The following disorders are additional conditions that may be detected by screening. Many are listed as "secondary targets" by the 2005 ACMG report. Some states are now screening for more than 50 congenital conditions. Many of these are rare and unfamiliar to pediatricians and other primary health care professionals.

Blood cell disorders
 Variant hemoglobinopathies (including Hb E)
 Glucose-6-phosphate dehydrogenase deficiency (G6PD)

Inborn errors of amino acid metabolism
 Tyrosinemia II
 Argininemia
 Benign hyperphenylalaninemia
 Defects of biopterin cofactor biosynthesis
 Defects of biopterin cofactor regeneration
 Tyrosinemia III
 Hypermethioninemia
 Citrullinemia type II

Inborn errors of organic acid metabolism
 Methylmalonic acidemia (Cbl C,D)
 Malonic acidemia
 2-Methyl 3-hydroxy butyric aciduria
 Isobutyryl-CoA dehydrogenase deficiency
 2-Methylbutyryl-CoA dehydrogenase deficiency
 3-Methylglutaconyl-CoA hydratase deficiency
 Glutaric acidemia type II
 HHH syndrome (Hyperammonemia, hyperornithinemia, homocitrullinuria syndrome)
 Beta-methyl crotonyl carboxylase deficiency
 Adenosylcobalamin synthesis defects

Inborn errors of fatty acid metabolism
 Medium/short-chain L-3-hydroxy acyl-CoA dehydrogenase deficiency
 Medium-chain ketoacyl-CoA thiolase deficiency
 Dienoyl-CoA reductase deficiency
 Glutaric acidemia type II
 Carnitine palmityl transferase deficiency type 1
 Carnitine palmityl transferase deficiency type 2
 Short-chain acyl-CoA dehydrogenase deficiency (SCAD)
 Carnitine/acylcarnitine Translocase Deficiency (Translocase)
 Short-chain hydroxy Acyl-CoA dehydrogenase deficiency (SCHAD)
 Long-chain acyl-CoA dehydrogenase deficiency (LCAD)
 Multiple acyl-CoA dehydrogenase deficiency (MADD)

Miscellaneous multisystem diseases
 Galactokinase deficiency
 Galactose epimerase deficiency
 Maternal vitamin B12 deficiency

Disorders added after the initial panel was defined
In addition to identifying a core list of disorders that infants in the United States should be screened for, the ACMG also established a framework for nominating future conditions, and the structure under which those conditions should be considered.  
 Severe combined immune deficiency (SCID) - added in 2009
 Critical congenital heart defects (Screened using pulse oximetry) - added in 2010
 Pompe disease - added in 2013
 Mucopolysaccharidosis type I - added in 2015
 X-linked adrenoleukodystrophy - added in 2018
 Spinal muscular atrophy - added in 2018

References

Epidemiology

Medical lists
Neonatology
Rare diseases
Newborn screening